The Asian Shooting Championships are governed by the Asian Shooting Confederation. Asian Shooting Championships began in 1967. These championships, including almost all ISSF shooting events, are held every four years.

Asian Shooting Championships

Asian Airgun Championships

Asian Shotgun Championships
Asian Clay Shooting Championships were first held in 1981. This kind of championship has been discontinued and new Asian Shotgun tournament starts in 2011.

Asian Clay Shooting Championships

Asian Shotgun Championships

References

ISSF Results Overview

External links
Asian Shooting Confederation
Asian Clay Shooting Website

 
Asian
Shooting
Recurring sporting events established in 1967
Shooting sports in Asia